Franceville is one of the four largest cities in Gabon, with a population of 110,568 at the 2013 census. It lies on the Mpassa River and at the end of the Trans-Gabon Railway and the N3 road. It grew from a village named Masuku when Pierre Savorgnan de Brazza chose it to resettle former slaves and renamed it Francheville (meaning "city of the freed") in 1880. The city later came to be called Franceville (meaning "French city").

Overview 
Brazza founded Franceville on June 13, 1880. The former name was Masuku. As time went on, it became known as Franceville.

Features of the town include St Hilaire's Church (built in 1899), a large statue of President Omar Bongo (who was born in Franceville), a primate medical research institute, and a golf course. Bongo was buried in Franceville on June 18, 2009.

There is a market where numerous items can be purchased, including clothing, fruit and vegetables, electronics, meats, and the market also sells bushmeat, which includes Central African rock python, monkey and local species of animals.

There are a few hotels, of which the best known is the Hôtel Poubara, overlooking the president's holiday home.

Franceville also has many waterfalls. One of the best known is the Poubara Falls, which is co-located with a hydroelectric plant that provides the area with constant electricity.

Population
The population was 31,183 in 1993. The 2010 population was approximated at 56,000. Another population number is 42,967, possibly retrieved following the disputed census of 2003 (alternately a 2004 estimate). Another recent estimate gives the population as 75,000.

Climate 
Franceville has a tropical savanna climate (Köppen climate classification Aw). There are a lot of thunderstorms in the city.

Education
Franceville is home to the University of Science and Technology of Masuku (USTM), Gabon's hard sciences university, with the other subjects being taught in Libreville. It welcomes students from all African countries. It is home to the Canadian-sponsored Polytechnic and Faculty of Science and the National Higher Institute of Agronomy and Biotechnology, which trains agricultural engineers.
The city is also home to a doctoral school in the 2nd arrondissement.
Schools include École publique conventionnée de Franceville.

International relations

Twin towns – sister cities
Franceville is twinned with:
 Vire, France (since 1983)

See also 
 Oklo
 Oklo Mine
 Natural nuclear fission reactor
 Franceville, New Hebrides
 List of companies and cities in Africa that manufacture cement
 Railway stations in Gabon

References

Bibliography 
Maria Petringa, Brazza, A Life for Africa. Bloomington, IN: AuthorHouse, 2006.

External links
 Franceville map and weather
Mounana mine info at Mindat.org
Oklo mine info, site of over a dozen Precambrian natural nuclear reactors

1880 establishments in Africa
Geological type localities
Populated places established in 1880
Populated places in Haut-Ogooué Province
People of Liberated African descent
Repatriated Africans
Repatriated slaves